The Boeing NC-135 and NKC-135 are special versions of the Boeing C-135 Stratolifter and Boeing KC-135 Stratotanker modified to operate on several different programs.

Operational history

Readiness Program

In support of the U.S. Test Readiness Program  that was initiated in response to the Limited Test Ban Treaty (LTBT) of 1963, Sandia National Laboratories configured three NC-135 aircraft as flying laboratories to support atmospheric testing of nuclear weapons, should testing resume. These aircraft were based at Kirtland Air Force Base. Work was initiated in 1963 and the aircraft remained in service until 1976, flying principally for Sandia, the Los Alamos National Laboratory, and the Lawrence Livermore National Laboratory. The Atomic Energy Commission (AEC) maintained controlling oversight of the NC-135 flight test aircraft. After 1976, the aircraft flew for Air Force Weapons Laboratory.

Airborne astronomy missions

While flying simulations for the Test Readiness Program, the science teams assigned to the NC-135 aircraft realized that their flying laboratories could be effectively used to study solar eclipses as well as cosmic rays entering the atmosphere and the effects of magnetic fields in the ionosphere. Program scientists petitioned the AEC to allow for a program-within-a-program to use the aircraft for such scientific research. The petition was approved, and research continued through 1975.

The first eclipse mission took place from Pago Pago International Airport in 1965.  Flying in conjunction with several other science aircraft, one of the NC-135s managed to fly within eclipse totality for 160 seconds, providing valuable science data. Eclipse missions were also flown in 1970, 1972, 1973, 1979 and 1980.

Big Crow
Big Crow is the designation of the two NKC-135 test-bed aircraft (55-3132 and 63-8050) heavily modified for electronic warfare testing.  These planes were also used as a target simulator for flight testing the Boeing YAL-1 Airborne Laser.  On March 15, 2007, the YAL-1 successfully fired this laser in flight, hitting its target. The target was the NKC-135E Big Crow 1 test aircraft that had been specially modified with a "signboard" target on its fuselage. The test validated the system's ability to track an airborne target and measure and compensate for atmospheric distortion.

Big Crow aircraft are also used as downrange telemetry assets in conjunction with Western Launch and Test Range launches from Vandenberg Air Force Base in California.

Since 2008, 55-3132 and 63-8050 have been retired, and relegated to the AMARG (Davis-Monthan AFB, Tucson, AZ).

Other versions

One aircraft, serial 61–2666, has been modified as an NC-135W to test systems and equipment used on RC-135V and W Rivet Joint reconnaissance aircraft.

From 1975 to 1984, the US used an NKC-135 for its Airborne Laser Lab program. The modified NKC-135A carried 10.6 micrometer Carbon Dioxide Laser. Tests included successful interceptions of small air-to-air missiles (such as the AIM-9 Sidewinder) and of drone aircraft. Despite the combat potential of the system, it was kept strictly experimental. However, the SCUD threat faced during the Gulf War reignited interest in an airborne laser system, resulting in the Boeing YAL-1.

Operators

 United States Air Force
 United States Navy

Survivors
 55-3123 - Originally built as a KC-135A, since 1984 NKC-135 Airborne Laser Lab has been on display at the National Museum of the United States Air Force in Dayton, Ohio. In August 2011 it was removed from display in the Museum's Air Park to make room for the arrival of the Museum's C-5A Galaxy. The aircraft is currently in storage.

Specifications (NKC-135A)

See also

References

External links 

C-0135N, Boeing
Nuclear warfare
Telemetry
C-135N, Boeing
Quadjets
Low-wing aircraft